The 9th Parliament of Zimbabwe is the current meeting of the Zimbabwean Parliament, composed of the Senate and the National Assembly. It began meeting in Harare on 18 September 2018. Its membership was set by the 2018 Zimbabwean general election, which gave the ruling ZANU–PF party a two-thirds majority in Parliament and control of both chambers. The Movement for Democratic Change Alliance is the minority coalition.

Overview 
The 9th Parliament of Zimbabwe's membership was set by the 30 July 2018 election, which gave the incumbent ruling party, ZANU–PF, a two-thirds parliamentary majority, with control of both the Senate and the National Assembly. The MDC Alliance, a coalition composed of the Movement for Democratic Change – Tsvangirai and other opposition parties, won all but two of the remaining seats in the House.

Per Section 143 (1) of the Constitution of Zimbabwe, the 9th Parliament will officially begin the day the president-elect is sworn in. Per Section 145 (1) of the Constitution, the president advises as to the date of the official opening of Parliament, and Section 145 (2) stipulates that the date will be officially set by the Clerk of Parliament. The official opening of Parliament must not be held more than 30 days after the presidential inauguration. The inauguration, initially scheduled for 12 August 2018, had to be postponed indefinitely after the MDC Alliance filed a petition with the Constitutional Court challenging the presidential election results. The Parliament cannot open until after the court announces its decision and the president is inaugurated.

Sessions 
President Emmerson Mnangagwa opened the first session of the 9th Parliament on 18 September 2018. The second session was opened by the president on 1 October 2019. The second session closed on 22 October 2020, and the third session opened the same day just before midday. The third session adjourned on 16 September 2021, and officially ended just before midday on 7 October 2021. The fourth session of parliament opened that afternoon, marked by President Mnangagwa's State of the Nation address. The fifth session opened on 23 November 2022, an event that marked the first legislative sitting in Zimbabwe's new parliament building in Mount Hampden.

Party summary

Senate

House of Assembly

Members

See also 
 Politics of Zimbabwe

References 

2018 establishments in Zimbabwe
Zimbabwean parliaments